Sandesh Gulhane (born  1982) is a British doctor and Conservative politician who has been a Member of the Scottish Parliament (MSP) for the Glasgow region since May 2021. He is the Scottish Conservative Shadow Cabinet Secretary for Health and Social Care. Gulhane is the first Hindu and first man of Indian descent to be elected to the Scottish Parliament.

Background
Gulhane was born and educated in London, England; he has two children. His parents were from the city of Amravati, in Maharashtra, India. 

He studied at Imperial College London, having been a doctor since 2006. He operated as a general practitioner in Glasgow, having previously worked as an orthopaedic registrar in hospitals in the city and East Kilbride, after moving to Scotland around 2011. Before then, he was based in Birmingham and Newcastle upon Tyne. He was Club Doctor as part of the medical staff of SPFL football club Queens Park F.C. from 2017 until August 2021. Gulhane continues to work one day per week as a GP.

Political career
Gulhane stood as the Conservative candidate for the Glasgow Pollok constituency and Glasgow regional list at the 2021 Scottish Parliament election, and was elected for the Glasgow region.

On 16 September 2021, Gulhane was appointed as Shadow Cabinet Secretary for Health and Social Care, following the resignation of Annie Wells from the role.

See also
 List of British Indians
 List of ethnic minority politicians in the United Kingdom

References

External links 
 

Year of birth missing (living people)
Living people
Politicians from London
British general practitioners
Conservative MSPs
Members of the Scottish Parliament 2021–2026
British politicians of Indian descent
Queen's Park F.C. non-playing staff
British Hindus
British people of Marathi descent